Garrett Gardner is an American singer and songwriter. He auditioned twice to the US edition of The Voice. His first attempt in season 3 ended in failure with no coach turning their chair, while his second attempt in season 4 earned him a spot on the Top 12 finals. He was eliminated finishing 11th–12th in the series. Gardner sings funky pop, rock, and blues.

Early life
Gardner was born and raised in Ringwood, New Jersey. His parents are both musicians. Since he was one year old, Gardner has played toy instruments like the drum.  In an interview with Christina Milan, he stated that his musical exploits as a toddler evolved into him playing actual drums and other instruments as an adult.

Career

The Voice, season 3
In 2012, on season 3 of The Voice, Gardner auditioned but was not selected by any coaches. He sang "Have You Ever Seen the Rain?" by Creedence Clearwater Revival. He did receive constructive advice from coach Adam Levine. After his audition fell short, Gardner's father died, which encouraged him to try out again the next season.

The Voice, season 4
On season 4 of The Voice, Gardner auditioned and joined Shakira's team, since she was the only judge to turn a chair. He sang the "Seven Nation Army" by The White Stripes, capturing Shakira's interest with his signature voice.

In the battle rounds, Gardner was paired with J'Sun from Team Shakira and performed "How You Like Me Now?". They were mentored by Joel Madden. After his performance, Shakira chose Gardner.

Gardner then went into the knockout rounds in which he competed against Tawnya Reynolds. He sang "Too Close" by Alex Clare and was chosen to enter the top 16 as semi-finalist.

As he advanced into the live playoffs, he sang "Imagine" by John Lennon where he played piano. His performance led the judges to save him, and he advanced to the top 12. Before the top 12 results, Team Shakira performed "We Are the Champions" in episode 15. Team Blake & Team Shakira joined forces, performing the song "Hall of Fame", as non-competition intermission number, with Gardner as part of the team.

In the top 12 live performances, Gardner crooned "I Want It That Way" by the Backstreet Boys, which received positive feedback from the judges. However, on results night, he did not get through to the top 10 by the public votes. Gardner exited the competition on May 14.

2013–present
Later, Gardner was invited to perform as a guest on Fox's talk show Good Day New York. On May 17, 2013, he sang his original composition "The Valley".

Performances on The Voice
 – Studio version of performance reached the top 10 on iTunes

References

Year of birth missing (living people)
Living people
The Voice (franchise) contestants
American male pop singers
21st-century American male singers
21st-century American singers